Born in Cleveland, Ohio, Leza Marie McVey (née Sullivan) (1907–1984) was an American ceramist and weaver.

McVey studied at the Cleveland Institute of Art (1927–1932) and at the Colorado Springs Fine Art Center (1943–1944). In 1932, she married the sculptor William Mozart McVey, and from 1935 to 1947, she worked as a ceramist in Houston, Austin, and San Antonio. William accepted a teaching position at the Cranbrook Academy of Art in Michigan in 1947, and there she met the Finnish artist Maija Grotell and became friends with the Japanese-American artist Toshiko Takaezu who studied at the Cranbrook Academy from 1951 to 1954.  In 1953, McVey returned to her native city of Cleveland and established her studio in the suburb of  Pepper Pike, Ohio.

McVey's large-scaled, biomorphic, asymmetrical work is said to reflect her dissatisfaction with wheel-thrown pieces and to have led the way for modern ceramic art in the United States. Influenced by surrealism, her sculptural stoneware and porcelain works embody the natural, organic form.  In 1965, the Cleveland Institute of Art presented a major retrospective of her work that included seventy-five large scale sculptures or what she called "ceramic forms." By 1979 McVey's production slowed due to her failing eyesight.

Collections containing work 
McVey's work may be found in several private, corporate, and public collections:
 Butler Institute of American Art, Youngstown, Ohio
 General Motors Corporation, Detroit, Michigan
 Smithsonian Institution, Washington, DC

Related reading
Eidelberg, Martin P., The Ceramic Forms of Leza McVey. Hudson, New York: Philmark Publishers, 2002.

References

1907 births
1984 deaths
American potters
Cleveland School (arts community)
American women ceramists
American ceramists
20th-century American women artists
Artists from Cleveland
20th-century American artists
Women potters
20th-century ceramists